Phillip Alexander (born June 1, 1983) is an American football defensive end. He was signed on May 4, 2006 by the Houston Texans as an undrafted free agent. He was released on August 14, 2006.

Alexander played college football for the Duke Blue Devils.

References

External links
NFL.com player page
Duke Blue Devils player page

1983 births
Living people
Players of American football from St. Louis
American football defensive ends
Duke Blue Devils football players
Houston Texans players